The Chutine River, originally named the Clearwater River, is a major right tributary of the Stikine River in northwestern British Columbia, Canada.  It is located west of the Stikine Icecap and just inside the boundary between Alaska and British Columbia.  The former settlement of Chutine or Chutine Landing is located at the confluence of the Chutine and Stikine.  The name means "half-people" in the Tahltan language (i.e. half-Tahltan, half-Tlingit).

See also
Chutine Peak
List of British Columbia rivers

References

Rivers of British Columbia
Stikine Country
Stikine River